Baaz is a 1953 Hindi action film directed by Guru Dutt. This film is Guru Dutt's first starring film, an action film packed with adventure staged mainly on a ship.

Plot 
The 16th century, the Malabar Coast. General Barbosa (KN Singh) signs a treaty with the queen (Sulochana) of a small state giving the Portuguese right to trade in exchange for military protection. With the help of the queen's nephew Jaswant (Ramsingh), he begins to meddle in the administration as well. He arrests merchant Ramzan Ali and his friend Narayan Das. Das' daughter Nisha (Geeta Bali) tries to save her father but is caught by Barbosa and both are sold to a cruel Portuguese pirate Cabral. Cabral kills Narayan Das. Nisha rouses her fellow slaves to revolt against Cabral and once Cabral is killed Nisha becomes a pirate queen pillaging all Portuguese ships in sight. One such ship includes heir to the throne Prince Ravi (Guru Dutt), a Portuguese woman Rosita (Kuldip Kaur) and a court astrologer (Johnny Walker). Nisha spares their lives as Ravi had saved her life earlier. They inevitably fall in love. Ravi joins the mutineers without revealing his identity. Back on shore, Ravi learns Jaswant is to be crowned king. Ravi is arrested and sentenced to death. Nisha saves him and they join forces with other local chiefs to defeat Barbosa.

Cast 
 Guru Dutt as Prince Ravi
 Geeta Bali as Nisha 
 K. N. Singh as General Barborosa
 Johnny Walker as Court Astrologer 
 Yashodra Katju as Nisha's Friend
 Ruby Myers as Raj Mata
 Kuldip Kaur as Rosita
 Jankidas  as Ramzan Ali Saudagar

Soundtrack 
The music was composed by O. P. Nayyar and the lyrics were penned by Majrooh Sultanpuri.

References

External links 
 

1953 films
Indian black-and-white films
1950s Hindi-language films
Films directed by Guru Dutt
Films scored by O. P. Nayyar
Indian action films
1950s action films